Krewe of Carrollton is a New Orleans Mardi Gras krewe.

History and formation 

The Krewe of Carrollton was formed from the Seventh District Carnival Club by Oak Street merchants in 1924 and is the 4th oldest Krewe in New Orleans 

The riding membership now includes over 450 people. The krewe owns its own floats, which are stored in a den on Oak Street and are often rented out to other krewes for their parades.

Parade

The original parade route was around the Carrollton neighborhood centering upon Maple and Oak street commercial districts. Until 1948 Krewe of Carrollton paraded on Mardi Gras day, the krewe now parades nine days before Fat Tuesday, during the first full weekend of Mardi Gras parades. This weekend is now commonly referred to as "Carrollton Weekend" among locals.

Parade themes

During the krewe's 1 February 1970 ride, a float was overturned by a tornado while crossing the overpass on Jefferson Davis Parkway. Peter Latino Sr,. the 52-year old president of the krewe, was thrown 35 feet over the overpass and onto the adjacent railroad tracks, suffering massive head and internal injuries. He remained in a coma for 30 months before passing away on 14 July 1972. As a result of this accident, riders in all parades are now required to wear safety harnesses while on a float.

Throws 
Trinkets, collectables, masks, and beads tossed by hand from riders of the floats are called throws. Collectible throws from Krewe of Carrollton include multi-colored doubloon coins, fedoras, specialty beads, and go-cups.

Krewe of Carrollton are known for their hand decorated shrimp boots.

References

External links
 

Parades in the United States
Mardi Gras in New Orleans